First Contact? is a juvenile science fiction novel, the thirteenth in Hugh Walters' Chris Godfrey of U.N.E.X.A. series.

It was published in the UK by Faber in 1971, in the US by T.Nelson Books in 1973.

Plot summary
Radio signals begin flooding Earth from the vicinity of Uranus and two ships, each with a crew of four are sent to investigate.  The signals are traced to an alien spaceship on Ariel, one of the moons of Uranus.  The ships land and all but two enter the alien vessel to converse with the apparently friendly humanoid alien, Vari.  One of the two remaining crewmen believe the alien to be malevolent and determines to destroy it.

References

External links
First Contact? page  including a review by Theodore Sturgeon

1971 British novels
1971 science fiction novels
Ariel (moon)
Chris Godfrey of U.N.E.X.A. series
Faber and Faber books
Fiction set on Uranus
1971 children's books